Zamir Alexza White, nicknamed "Zeus" (born September 18, 1999), is an American football running back for the Las Vegas Raiders of the National Football League (NFL). He played college football at Georgia and was drafted by the Raiders in the fourth round of the 2022 NFL Draft.

Early life and high school
White grew up in Laurinburg, North Carolina and attended Scotland High School, where he was a member of the football and track teams. As a senior, White rushed for 2,086 yards (14.1 yards per carry) and 34 touchdowns and won the Sam B. Nicola Award as the national high school player of the year before tearing his ACL in the second round of the state playoffs. White was a consensus top-five recruit at the running back position and committed to play college football at Georgia over offers from  Alabama, Clemson, North Carolina and Ohio State.

College career
White redshirted his true freshman season after suffering a second torn ACL during summer training camp. White scored the first touchdown of his college career on September 7, 2019 against Murray State in an eight carry, 72 yard effort in a 63-17 win. He rushed for a season high 92 yards and one touchdown on 18 carries against Baylor in the 2020 Sugar Bowl. White finished his redshirt freshman season with 408 yards and three touchdowns on 78 carries with two receptions for 20 yards. In the shortened 2020 season, White was Georgia's leading rusher with 779 yards and 11 touchdowns on 144 carries.  In 2021, White again led all Georgia running backs—a platoon that included James Cook, Kenny McIntosh, and Kendall Milton—with 856 yards and 11 touchdowns on 160 carries. On January 14, 2022, White declared for the 2022 NFL Draft.

Professional career

White was selected in the fourth round (122nd overall) by the Las Vegas Raiders in the 2022 NFL Draft. On June 8, 2022, White signed his rookie contract for the Raiders.

References

External links
 Las Vegas Raiders bio
Georgia Bulldogs bio

1999 births
Living people
American football running backs
Georgia Bulldogs football players
Las Vegas Raiders players
People from Laurinburg, North Carolina
Players of American football from North Carolina